Juan Manuel Rodríguez Parrondo (born 9 January 1964) is a Spanish physicist. He is mostly popular for the invention of the Parrondo's paradox and his contributions in the thermodynamical study of information.

Biography 
Juan Parrondo received his bachelors degree in 1987 and defended his Ph.D at Complutense University of Madrid in 1992. He started a permanent position at UCM at 1996. In the same year he invented the well-known Parrondo's Paradox, according to which 2 losing strategies may win while working together. Since then, the paradox has been widely used in biology and finances. He has also completed a lot of research in the field of Information Theory, mostly looking at information as a thermodynamic concept, which as a result of ergodicity breaking changed the entropy of the system.

Works by Juan M.R. Parrondo

"Noise-Induced Non-equilibrium Phase Transition" C. Van den Broeck, J. M. R. Parrondo and R. Toral, Physical Review Letters, vol. 73 p. 3395 (1994)

Notes

Further reading

"Game theory: Losing strategies can win by Parrondo's paradox" G. P. Harmer and D. Abbott, Nature vol. 402, p. 864 (1999)

External links
 Home page of Juan M. R. Parrondo
 

1964 births
Living people
People from Madrid
Spanish physicists
Probability theorists
Complutense University of Madrid alumni